Proletarian Democracy (DP) was a far-left political party in Italy.

History

1970s
DP was founded in 1975 as a joint electoral front of the Proletarian Unity Party (PdUP), Workers Vanguard (AO) and the "Workers Movement for Socialism" (MLS), for the 1975 Italian regional elections. At the local level, smaller groups joined, such as the "Marxist-Leninist Communist Organization", "Revolutionary Communist Groups - IV International" and the "League of the Communists".

DP took part in the 1976 elections, winning 556,022 votes (1.51%) and 6 seats in the election to the Chamber of Deputies. On 13 April 1978, DP was transformed into a political party. The move to make DP into a real political party was pushed through by the minority wing of PdUP, led by journalist Vittorio Foa and Silvano Miniati; the majority of AO, led by Massimo Gorla and Luigi Vinci; and the League of the Communists, led by Romano Luporini.

The main figure of DP was the charismatic Mario Capanna, a former student leader associated with the 1968 New Left movement.

The strongholds of DP were the industrial cities of Northern Italy, which had strong leftist traditions. DP was opposed to the so-called 'historic compromise' between the Italian Communist Party and the Christian Democrats.

During the 1978 electoral campaign, Peppino Impastato, a leading DP militant from Sicily, was murdered by the Mafia.

In the 1979 elections for the European Parliament, DP won 1 seat in the Technical Group of Independents group.

1980s
In the 1983 Italian general election DP won 542,039 votes (1.47%) and 7 seats in the election to the Chamber of Deputies. In the 1987 general election DP won 642,161 votes (1.66%) and 8 seats in the election to the Chamber of Deputies. In the same year DP won 493,667 votes (1.52%) and one seat in the election to the Senate.

In 1987 Capanna stepped down, and Giovanni Russo Spena became the secretary of DP. Two years later, the DP suffered a split, as a section led by Capanna launched their own list on ahead of the elections to the European Parliament, in association with leading Radicals, called the Rainbow Greens.

1990s
On 9 June 1991 the congress of DP in Riccione decided to merge the party into the Communist Refoundation Movement, which became the Communist Refoundation Party.

Election results

Italian Parliament

European Parliament

References

Defunct political parties in Italy
History of the Communist Refoundation Party
Political parties established in 1975
Defunct communist parties in Italy
Political parties disestablished in 1991
1975 establishments in Italy
1991 disestablishments in Italy